The Silver Bow County Poor Farm Hospital at 3040 Continental Dr. in Butte, Montana was built in 1902.  It includes design by architect Charles S. Haire.  It was listed on the National Register of Historic Places in 1981.

It is now the headquarters building of the National Center for Appropriate Technology.

References

Hospital buildings completed in 1902
Hospital buildings on the National Register of Historic Places in Montana
National Register of Historic Places in Silver Bow County, Montana